Eccentricity or eccentric may refer to:

 Eccentricity (behavior), odd behavior on the part of a person, as opposed to being "normal"

Mathematics, science and technology

Mathematics
 Off-center, in geometry
 Eccentricity (graph theory) of a vertex in a graph
 Eccentricity (mathematics), a parameter associated with every conic section

Orbital mechanics
 Orbital eccentricity, in astrodynamics, a measure of the non-circularity of an orbit
 Eccentric anomaly, the angle between the direction of periapsis and the current position of an object on its orbit
 Eccentricity vector, in celestial mechanics, a dimensionless vector with direction pointing from apoapsis to periapsis
 Eccentric, a type of deferent, a circle or sphere used in obsolete epicyclical systems to carry a planet around the Earth or Sun

Other uses in science and technology
 Eccentric (mechanism), a wheel that rotates on an axle that is displaced from the focus of the circle described by the wheel
 Horizontal eccentricity, in vision, degrees of visual angle from the center of the eye
 Eccentric contraction, the lengthening of muscle fibers
 Eccentric position of a surveying tripod, to be able to measure hidden points
 Eccentric training, the motion of an active muscle while it is lengthening under load
 Eccentricity, a deviation from concentricity

Other uses
 Eccentric Club, a London gentlemen's club
 The Eccentric
 The Eccentrics

See also 
 
 
 Acentric (disambiguation)

ta:சுற்றுப்பாதையின் வட்டவிலகல்